Sir Jermyn Davers, 4th Baronet (c.1686 – 20 February 1743), of Rougham and Rushbrooke, Suffolk, was an English landowner and Tory politician who sat in the House of Commons from 1722 to 1743.

Early life
Davers was the second son of Sir Robert Davers, 2nd Baronet and his wife, Hon. Mary Jermyn, daughter and co-heiress of Thomas Jermyn, 2nd Baron Jermyn. He was brought up at Rushbrooke Hall and matriculated at Christ Church, Oxford on 14 March 1704, aged 17.

Career
At the 1722 British general election, Davers was returned in a contest as a Tory Member of Parliament for Bury St Edmunds. He succeeded his brother Sir Robert Davers, 3rd Baronet, to the baronetcy on 20 May 1723. In April 1725, he was one of five Tories who voted against a motion to restore the inheritance of Bolingbroke. He inherited the Jermyn estates, including Cheveley, Cambridgeshire, and Dover Street, London, in 1726 from his great uncle, Henry Jermyn, 1st Baron Dover.  At the 1727 British general election, he was returned as MP for Suffolk, topping the poll in a contest. He voted consistently against the government. He was returned unopposed for Suffolk in 1734 British general election and 1741 British general election.

Later life and legacy
Davers appear to have had two illegitimate sons before his marriage to Margaretta Green, the daughter of Rev. Edward Green, rector of Drinkstone, Suffolk, on 21 October 1729. He died on 20 February 1743, leaving in addition four legitimate sons of whom two shot themselves, and two daughters: 
Mary Davers (1730–1805)
Charles Davers (died young)
Elizabeth Davers (1733 – 19 December 1800), married Frederick Hervey, 4th Earl of Bristol
Sir Robert Davers, 5th Baronet (1735 – 6 May 1763) unmarried
Lt. Henry Davers, RN (d. 1759), shot himself on board HMS Neptune
Sir Charles Davers, 6th Baronet (4 June 1737 – 4 June 1806), married Frances Trice
Rev. Thomas Davers, (1738-1766)

He was succeeded in the baronetcy by his son Robert who was killed in Canada during Pontiac's Rebellion and then, by Charles.

References

Year of birth unknown
1743 deaths
18th-century English people
Alumni of Christ Church, Oxford
Baronets in the Baronetage of England
Members of the Parliament of Great Britain for English constituencies
British MPs 1722–1727
British MPs 1727–1734
British MPs 1734–1741
British MPs 1741–1747
English landowners
Tory members of the Parliament of Great Britain
Year of birth uncertain